The Virginia Cavaliers men's lacrosse team represents the University of Virginia in National Collegiate Athletic Association (NCAA) Division I men's lacrosse. The Cavaliers compete in the Atlantic Coast Conference (ACC) and plays home games at Klöckner Stadium, or occasionally Turf Field or Scott Stadium, in Charlottesville, Virginia. The team is coached by Lars Tiffany, who led the team to back-to-back national titles in the 2019 NCAA Lacrosse Championship and 2021 NCAA Lacrosse Championship (the 2020 tournament being canceled due to COVID-19).

Winning seven NCAA Championships and nine national titles overall, Virginia is one of the all-time great collegiate lacrosse programs. Virginia's 2006 team was one of the strongest in the history of the sport, finishing 17–0 out of a very competitive ACC, and winning 16 of its 17 games by four or more goals. Each former Virginia head coach in the NCAA era of men's lacrosse (Dom Starsia, "Ace" Adams, and Glenn Thiel) is among the top 25 of all-time lacrosse coaching wins. Both Tiffany and Starsia coincidentally moved into the Virginia position after they first achieved success as head coaches at their alma mater Brown University.

Virginia's historic rivalries have extended to the championship matches of six different NCAA Tournaments, with the Cavaliers winning five of those six—defeating Syracuse in 1999, defeating Maryland in 2011 and in 2021, and defeating Johns Hopkins in 1972 and in 2003—while losing just one, in double-overtime, to Hopkins in 1980.

History
University records show that Virginia fielded lacrosse teams from 1904 to 1907, although no further information from that period is available. After a hiatus, lacrosse returned to Charlottesville in 1925 though the team struggled in the ensuing years. Through 1932, the Cavaliers won only one game, while they lost 30 and tied four. Virginia along with Duke, UNC, and Washington & Lee played in the Dixie Lacrosse League from 1938 to 1942 with the Cavaliers winning the championship in the inaugural season.  The team was disbanded after the 1932 season and would play sporadically until lacrosse returned for good in 1947. Two years later, Virginia won more games than it lost for the first time in school history when it posted a 7–4 record. The Cavaliers then posted an 8–3 mark in 1950 and 7–2 in 1951. The following season, they recorded an identical tally and the United States Intercollegiate Lacrosse Association (USILA) named Virginia the 1952 co-national champions.

In 1970, Virginia finished the season with an 8–2 record and the USILA again awarded them as co-champions with Navy and Johns Hopkins. The following season, the NCAA instituted a single-elimination tournament to determine the national championship, and the Cavaliers made an appearance but were eliminated by Navy in the first round. In 1972, Virginia again secured a tournament berth, and beat in succession Army, Cortland State, and Johns Hopkins for their first NCAA national championship. In 1978, former Army coach Jim "Ace" Adams took over as head coach, and from that season onward, Virginia has been a regular participant in the NCAA tournament. Since then, the Cavaliers have never failed to qualify in two consecutive seasons. Virginia advanced to the championship game in 1980, 1986, 1994, and 1996, each time falling to the eventual champion by one goal. In 1993, Dom Starsia became head coach, leading the Cavaliers to national titles in 1999, 2003, 2006, and 2011. Since the establishment of an ACC tournament in 1989, Virginia has won the regular-season championship ten times, more than any of the other three teams in the league.

Virginia's 2006 season was remarkable as the Cavaliers became the first team in NCAA history to finish the season with a 17–0 record en route to the program's third national championship in eight years. The team won its games by an average of more than eight goals per game and drew comparisons to some of the best lacrosse teams of all time. The Virginia offense led the nation in scoring (15.28), while the defense ranked 10th, allowing fewer than eight goals per game. Eight Cavaliers were named All-Americans, the most in program history, and senior attackman Matt Ward received the Tewaaraton Trophy as the best player in the nation.

In 2011, the Cavaliers posted a 9–5 regular-season record before entering the NCAA tournament, where they defeated Bucknell, Cornell, Denver, and finally Maryland 9–7 to win their fifth NCAA championship. During the tournament, head coach Dom Starsia became the all-time wins leader in Division I men's lacrosse history, breaking Jack Emmer's previous mark of 326 wins. Five Cavaliers were named USILA All-Americans. Following the tournament, third-year attackman Steele Stanwick won the Tewaaraton Trophy as the nation's top player. Starsia left the program at the conclusion of the 2016 season after a poor run of four seasons that included two losing records – only the program's third and fourth since the NCAA championship era began in 1971.

Brown head coach Lars Tiffany, who had played for Starsia at the college, was named as his replacement on June 21, 2016. In his third season, Tiffany led the Cavaliers to an 17–3 season record, an ACC championship, and back to the 2019 National Championship Game where they defeated Yale, 13–9, to claim their eighth title. After the 2020 season was cancelled due to COVID-19, Tiffany led the 2021 team to a 14–4 season record and the 2021 National Championship Game where they defeated Maryland, 17–16, to retain their title.

Rivalries
Virginia–Syracuse has been an extremely evenly matched series between two lacrosse titans. Virginia has gained the upper hand in the Johns Hopkins and Maryland rivalries since the 1980s and 1990s, but trails in those all-time series (especially to Johns Hopkins) as a "late blooming" national power.

 Virginia–Syracuse lacrosse rivalry, Syracuse leads 20–18, but Virginia has a 7–3 edge in NCAA Tournaments.
 Virginia–Johns Hopkins lacrosse rivalry, Virginia leads 20–13 since 1994 but trails the overall series 61–32–1.
 Virginia–Maryland lacrosse rivalry, Virginia leads 38–18 since 1980 but trails the overall series 47–46.

Season Results
The following is a list of Virginia's results by season as an NCAA Division I program:

{| class="wikitable"

|- align="center"

†NCAA canceled 2020 collegiate activities due to the COVID-19 virus.

Alumni in the Premier Lacrosse League (10)

References

External links
 

NCAA Division I men's lacrosse teams
Virginia Cavaliers men's lacrosse